Cold wave may refer to:

Cold wave: A weather phenomenon in Winter that brings colder weather.
Cold wave: A style of post-punk originating in France.
Coldwave: A style of industrial metal originating in the United States.